The Vandalia Railroad  is a shortline railroad subsidiary of Pioneer Railcorp, providing local service from a CSX Transportation connection in Vandalia, Illinois. The line part of the original main line of the Illinois Central Railroad, completed in the 1850s between Cairo and Galena. Successor Illinois Central Gulf Railroad abandoned the portion through Centralia in 1981, and in December 1983 the newly created Vandalia Railroad reactivated a short piece. Pioneer Railcorp gained control in October 1994.

References

External links

American companies established in 1983
Illinois railroads
Pioneer Lines
Railway companies established in 1983
Spin-offs of the Illinois Central Gulf Railroad
Transportation in Fayette County, Illinois